William Powers may refer to:

William Powers Jr. (1946–2019), former president of the University of Texas at Austin
William T. Powers (1926–2013), scientist associated with perceptual control theory
William T. Powers (industrialist) (1820–1909), manufacturer and capitalist
William Powers (baritone), American opera singer
William Powers (writer) (born 1961), American writer, journalist and technologist
William Powers (politician) (active 1991–2001), former New York state Republican Party chairman
William F. Powers (born 1940), vice president of research for the Ford Motor Company
William W. Powers, member of the Illinois House of Representatives
Bill Powers (American politician) (born 1957), member of Tennessee General Assembly

See also
 Will Powers, stagename for Lynn Goldsmith (born 1948)
 Will Powers, fictional character from Ace Attorney, see List of Ace Attorney characters

 William Power (disambiguation)
 William (disambiguation)
 Powers (disambiguation)